Bob Beckwith (born September 21, 1933) is a former member of the New York City Fire Department.  He became well known to the United States' public after he stood next to President George W. Bush as the president gave a speech at the ruins of the World Trade Center after the attacks of September 11, 2001. Photos of Beckwith and the president appeared on the front page of the New York Daily News and the cover of Time magazine. This exposure launched him into the national spotlight and led to press attention and interviews. Beckwith has met several times with President Bush since then, spoken extensively in public, and acted as a fundraiser for charities.

Personal life
Beckwith has lived for more than 50 years with his wife Barbara in the same house in Baldwin, Nassau County, New York. The couple has six adult children.

Career
Beckwith is a veteran of the New York City Fire Department with 30 years of service from 1964 to 1994.

Actions at Ground Zero

On the morning of September 11, 2001, Beckwith was tending to his grandson, who had been hit by a car while biking to school.  Before he arrived at the hospital with his grandson, Beckwith was aware that a plane had struck the World Trade Center. When the boy appeared to be in stable condition, Beckwith left the hospital and went to World Trade Center site after he saw the South Tower collapse via television. Even though he had been retired for seven years from the New York City Fire Department, he grabbed his old gear and bluffed his way past the blockades and barricades that had been set up and began helping with bucket brigades and missing person searches.

On September 14, after Beckwith and some men had unearthed a fire engine buried in rubble from the fallen buildings, they tested its stability as a stand from which to speak, and a Secret Service agent ordered him to help President Bush onto the platform. Beckwith handed Bush a megaphone with which to address the crowd of responders and workers and was told to climb down by the Secret Service and Karl Rove, but Bush insisted that Beckwith stay with him. An image of Bush with Beckwith was featured the next day on the front page of the New York Daily News.

National fame and activities since 9/11
A photo of Bush with Beckwith standing together was published two weeks later on the cover of Time magazine, catapulting Beckwith to the national spotlight. Rejecting his new-found fame, he initially refused to speak to various news personalities and shows—Diane Sawyer, the Today Show, and Rosie O'Donnell—though he eventually appeared on MSNBC and other news channels and programs.

Beckwith continues to be bashful about his fame, though an enlarged version of the Time magazine cover that made him famous hangs in his den. Regarding the cover, Beckwith said that "[a]ll these guys that come over to interview me, they all have to have a picture of it." Beckwith also has a first edition print of the cover, which is encased in a display box together with a flag that waved at Ground Zero, given to him by President Bush. Beckwith has volunteered to have the items in his possession go to the 9/11 Memorial after he dies. He has already donated the clothes and helmet that he was wearing that day to the memorial.

Beckwith has visited 11 times with President Bush, traveled and spoken extensively, and dedicated much of his activity to fundraising for the New York Firefighters Burn Center Foundation.

On February 25, 2002, in a White House ceremony together with Governor George Pataki of New York state, Beckwith presented to Bush the bullhorn the president had used to address workers at the World Trade Center site just days after the attacks.

In the wake of the killing of Osama bin Laden by a team of U.S. Navy SEALs, Beckwith was asked his opinion.  He stated: "I would have liked it to be on George Bush's watch, but it wasn't, so OK."  He also said: "But I'm glad we got him. He's burning in hell and he's going to rot there."

References

External links
 WPIX Interview with Beckwith following the killing of Osama bin Laden

Living people
New York City firefighters
People associated with the September 11 attacks
1933 births